RFA Fort Rosalie was the lead ship of her class of Royal Fleet Auxiliary fleet replenishment ships. Fort Rosalie was originally named RFA Fort Grange, but was renamed in May 2000 to avoid confusion with the now-decommissioned .
On 31 March 2021, the ship was withdrawn from service.

Construction and design

In November 1971, two Fleet Replenishment ships of a new class were ordered for the Royal Fleet Auxiliary. Fort Grange was laid down by the shipbuilder Scott Lithgow at their shipyard at Greenock on the River Clyde on 9 November 1973, was launched on 9 December 1976 and commissioned on 6 April 1978.

Displacement is  full load, with a gross register tonnage of 16079 t, a net register tonnage of 6729 t and a deadweight tonnage of 8300 t.

Three stations for alongside replenishment are provided on each beam of the ship. A large hangar and flight deck are located aft, which were designed to accommodate up to four Westland Sea King helicopters for vertical replenishment or for anti-submarine duties, although typically the ship only carries a single helicopter in peacetime. The ship has a crew of 140 RFA personnel who man the ship, 36 Royal Navy personnel who operated and support the ship's helicopters and 45 civilian supply staff.

Service
The ship saw her first war service during the Falklands War. She was undergoing refit when Argentina invaded the Falklands in April 1982, but the refit was completed early, and Fort Grange left Devonport on 14 May 1982 to join the task force, carrying three Sea Kings of 824 Naval Air Squadron. She joined up with the fleet on 3 June, replenishing the ships of the fleet and forces on shore, as well as acting as a refuelling station for helicopters. She remained on station after the end of hostilities, and one of her helicopters was lost following an engine failure on 11 June, but all the crew were saved. Fort Grange set off for home on 17 September and reached Devonport on 3 October 1982.
 
In April 1994, Fort Grange was deployed alongside at the port of Split in Croatia, relieving  in supporting British forces carrying out peacekeeping duties in the Balkans for seven months. She resumed the support depot role at Split in April 1997, remaining on station until 6 January 2000, when she set out to return to the United Kingdom. She is affiliated to Tamworth and Lichfield Sea Cadets under her former name, Fort Grange.
In 2002 she supported HMS York during the response to 911.She provided the destroyer with fuel and stores whist York operated on operation veritas.

Fort Rosalie attended the HMNB Devonport Navy Days in August 2006, representing the Royal Fleet Auxiliary.

In May 2008 the ship entered a £28 million refit at Northwestern Shiprepairers & Shipbuilders' Cammell Laird yard in Birkenhead.

Fort Rosalie supported Exercise Cougar 11, the first partial deployment of the Royal Navy's Response Force Task Group. In 2011 it was announced that her service life would be extended by two years to 2024; the Fort class will ultimately be replaced by the Fleet Solid Support element of the Military Afloat Reach and Sustainability programme.

She spent early 2012 in the Caribbean and made a brief deployment to the Gulf of Oman in December 2012; since then she was exercising in home waters and entered refit in 2013. In June 2020, Fort Rosalie was reported to be in extended readiness (reserve) with replenishment rigs incompatible with the Royal Navy's Queen Elizabeth-class aircraft carriers.  The Integrated Review of 2020 announced that Fort Rosalie, along with Fort Austin would be decommissioned, with successors from the Fleet Solid Support plan set to replace the ships.

On 31 March 2021, RFA Fort Rosalie was withdrawn from service, and offered for sale on 21 May 2021, along with sister ship RFA Fort Austin, for recycling, however in October 2021 it was announced that the ship, together with her sister ship, had been sold to Egypt. While awaiting refit, it was reported that Fort Rosalie would be renamed ENS Abu Simbel which was carried out at Liverpool Cruise Terminal on 17 July 2022.

References

External links

 Official Website
 Timeline at www.historicalrfa.org

Fort Rosalie-class replenishment ships
Cold War auxiliary ships of the United Kingdom
Auxiliary ships of the United Kingdom
1976 ships
Gulf War ships of the United Kingdom
Ships of the Royal Fleet Auxiliary